Bayat-e Esfahan (Persian: بیات اصفهان) is one of melodic pieces of Iranian traditional music, known as a branch of Dastgah-e Shur or Dastgah-e Homayun. Some musical theorists consider the Bayat-e Esfahan an independent dastgah within the Persian radif system.

Features 
Ruhollah Khaleqi has noted that this mode conveys the emotional capacity of both happiness and sadness.

Branches
  (first preface)
  (second preface)
 
 
 
 
 
 
 
 Sufi name (or Saki name)

References 

Iranian music
Radif (music)